The 1908 State of the Union Address was written on Tuesday, December 8, 1908, by Theodore Roosevelt, the 26th president of the United States.  He did not speak directly to the 60th United States Congress. That did not happen until 1913.  He said about the navy, "I approve the recommendations of the General Board for the increase of the Navy, calling especial attention to the need of additional destroyers and colliers, and above all, of the four battleships. It is desirable to complete as soon as possible a squadron of eight battleships of the best existing type."

References

State of the Union addresses
Presidency of Theodore Roosevelt
Works by Theodore Roosevelt
60th United States Congress
State of the Union Address
State of the Union Address
State of the Union Address
State of the Union Address
December 1908 events
State of the Union